František Gerhát (born April 28, 1990) is a Slovak professional ice hockey player currently playing for HC Verva Litvínov in the Czech Extraliga.

Gerhat began his career with HC Slovan Bratislava, playing in their U18 and U20 teams before moving to Litvínov in 2008. He made his Czech Extraliga debut for the team during the 2009-10 Czech Extraliga season.

Career statistics

Regular season and playoffs

International

References

External links

1990 births
Living people
Slovak ice hockey forwards
Ice hockey people from Bratislava
HC Litvínov players
HC Stadion Litoměřice players
HC Most players
Slovak expatriate ice hockey players in the Czech Republic